Louis Emanuel (also Louis Alexander Emanuel or L. A. Emanuel) (1819–1889) was an English composer, conductor and bandmaster, born in Plymouth. He was music director at Vauxhall Gardens, London, from 1845. He was Jewish.

His compositions include "The Desert", "What Does Little Birdie Say?", "The Charm", "My Switzer Love Is Brave" and "The Syren and Friar".

References

English composers
Musicians from Plymouth, Devon
1819 births
1889 deaths
19th-century British composers
19th-century English musicians